Franciscus Bernardus Maria "Frans" de Waal (born October 29, 1948) is a Dutch primatologist and ethologist. He is the Charles Howard Candler Professor of Primate Behavior in the Department of Psychology at Emory University in Atlanta, Georgia, director of the Living Links Center at the Yerkes National Primate Research Center at Emory, and author of numerous books including Chimpanzee Politics (1982) and Our Inner Ape (2005). His research centers on primate social behavior, including conflict resolution, cooperation, inequity aversion, and food-sharing. He is a member of the United States National Academy of Sciences and the Royal Netherlands Academy of Arts and Sciences.

Early life and education
De Waal was born in 's-Hertogenbosch on October 29, 1948. He studied at the Dutch universities of Radboud University Nijmegen, University of Groningen, and Utrecht. In 1977, De Waal received his doctorate in biology from Utrecht University after training as a zoologist and ethologist with professor Jan van Hooff, a well-known expert of emotional facial expressions in primates. His dissertation titled: "Agonistic interactions and relations among Java-monkeys" concerned aggressive behavior and alliance formation in macaques. Fellow Dutch ethologist Niko Tinbergen was an inspiration to de Waal.

Career

In 1975, De Waal began a six-year project on the world's largest captive colony of chimpanzees at the Arnhem Zoo.  The study resulted in many scientific papers, and resulted in publication of his first book, Chimpanzee Politics, in 1982. This book offered the first description of primate behavior explicitly in terms of planned social strategies. De Waal was first to introduce the thinking of Machiavelli to primatology, leading to the label "Machiavellian Intelligence" that later became associated with it. In his writings, De Waal has never shied away from attributing emotions and intentions to his primates, and as such his work inspired the field of primate cognition that, three decades later, flourishes around themes of cooperation, altruism, and fairness.

His early work also drew attention to deception and conflict resolution, nowadays two major areas of research. Initially, all of this was highly controversial. Thus, the label of "reconciliation", which De Waal introduced for reunions after fights, was questioned at first, but is now fully accepted with respect to animal behavior. Recently, De Waal's work has emphasized non-human animal empathy and even the origins of morality. His most widely cited paper, written with his former student Stephanie Preston, concerns the evolutionary origin and neuroscience of empathy, not just in primates, but in mammals in general.

De Waal's name is also associated with bonobos, the "make love – not war" primates that he has made popular. But even his bonobo studies are secondary to the larger goal of understanding what binds primate societies together rather than how competition structures them.

Competition is not ignored in his work: the original focus of de Waal's research, before he was well known, was aggressive behavior and social dominance. Whereas his science focuses on the behavior of nonhuman primates (mostly chimpanzees, bonobos, macaques, and capuchin monkeys), his popular books have given de Waal worldwide visibility by relating the insights he has gained from monkey and ape behavior to human society. With his students, he has also worked on elephants, which are increasingly featured in his writings.

His research into the innate capacity for empathy among primates has led De Waal to the conclusion that non-human great apes and humans are simply different types of apes, and that empathic and cooperative tendencies are continuous between these species. His belief is illustrated in the following quote from The Age of Empathy: "We start out postulating sharp boundaries, such as between humans and apes, or between apes and monkeys, but are in fact dealing with sand castles that lose much of their structure when the sea of knowledge washes over them. They turn into hills, leveled ever more, until we are back to where evolutionary theory always leads us: a gently sloping beach."

This is quite opposite to the view of some economists and anthropologists, who postulate the differences between humans and other animals. However,  recent work on prosocial tendencies in apes and monkeys supports de Waal's position. See, for example, the research of Felix Warneken, a psychologist at the Max Planck Institute for Evolutionary Anthropology in Leipzig, Germany. In 2011, de Waal and his co-workers were the first to report that chimpanzees given a free choice between helping only themselves or helping themselves plus a partner, prefer the latter. In fact, de Waal does not believe these tendencies to be restricted to humans and apes, but views empathy and sympathy as universal mammalian characteristics, a view that over the past decade has gained support from studies on rodents and other mammals, such as dogs. He and his students have extensively worked on such cooperation and fairness in animals. In 2011 de Waal gave a TED Talk entitled "Moral behavior in animals". Part of the talk dealt with inequity aversion among capuchin monkeys, and a video extract of this went viral. It showed the furious reaction of one monkey given a less desirable treat than another. The most recent work in this area was the first demonstration that given a chance to play the Ultimatum game, chimpanzees respond in the same way as children and human adults by preferring the equitable outcome.

In 1981, de Waal moved to the United States for a position at the Wisconsin National Primate Research Center, and in 1991 took a position at Emory University, in Atlanta, Georgia. He is currently C.H. Candler Professor in the Psychology Department at Emory University and director of the Living Links Center at the Yerkes National Primate Research Center at Emory. He became an American citizen in 2008.

His 2013 book The Bonobo and the Atheist examines human behavior through the eyes of a primatologist, and explores to what extent God and religion are needed for human morality. The main conclusion is that morality comes from within, and is part of human nature. The role of religion is secondary.

De Waal also writes a column for Psychologie Magazine, a popular Dutch monthly.

Since September 1, 2013, de Waal has been a distinguished professor (universiteitshoogleraar) at Utrecht University. This is a part-time appointment—he remains in his position at Emory University, in Atlanta.

In October 2016, de Waal was the guest on the BBC Radio Four program The Life Scientific.

In June 2018, de Waal was awarded the NAT Award, recently established by the Museum of Natural Sciences of Barcelona. The award, which goes to people or institutions "that are referents for their way of viewing and explaining nature, whether because they have encouraged professional engagement in natural history disciplines or because they have contributed significantly to nature conservation", was awarded to de Waal "for his vision regarding the evolution of animal behaviour in establishing a parallel between primate and human behaviour in aspects such as politics, empathy, morality and justice." Alongside de Waal, broadcaster and naturalist David Attenborough was awarded an Extraordinary Award for a Professional Career, and biologist and former director of the Barcelona Zoology Museum Roser Nos Ronchera was awarded a Honorable Mention.

Awards

 2021 Doctor Honoris Causa, Université Jean-Monnet-Saint-Étienne (France)
 2020  PEN / EO Wilson Literary Science Writing Award (US)
 2018  Doctor Honoris Causa, Yale University (US)
 2018  NAT Award for the Dissemination of Natural Science, Barcelona (Spain)
 2017  Doctor Honoris Causa, Radboud University (Netherlands)
 2015  ASP Distinguished Primatologist (American Society of Primatologists)
 2014  Galileo Prize (Premio Letterario Galileo), Padua (Italy)
 2014  Eugène Dubois Chair, Maastricht University (Netherlands)
 2013  Edward O. Wilson Biodiversity Technology Pioneer Award
 2013  Foreign Member, Royal Holland Society of Sciences and Humanities
 2013  Doctor Honoris Causa, Utrecht University (Netherlands)
 2012  Ig Nobel Prize winner, in the Anatomy category
 2011	Discover magazine's "47 (all time) Great Minds of Science"
 2011  Doctor Honoris Causa, Colgate University (US)
 2010  Knight of the Order of the Netherlands Lion
 2009	Medal, Società di Medicina & Scienze Naturali, Parma (Italy)
 2009	Ariëns Kappers Medal, Royal Netherlands Academy of Arts and Sciences
 2009	Doctor Honoris Causa, University for Humanistics (Netherlands)
 2008	Member of the American Academy of Arts and Sciences (AAAS)
 2007  Time 100 world's most influential people
 2005	Member of the American Philosophical Society (APS)
 2005	Arthur W. Staats Award, American Psychological Foundation
 2004	Member of the (US) National Academy of Sciences (NAS)
 1993  Corresponding member of the Royal Netherlands Academy of Arts and Sciences (KNAW)
 1989 Los Angeles Times Book Award for Peacemaking among Primates

Selected bibliography

Books

 Different: Gender Through the Eyes of a Primatologist, 2022. 
 
 Are We Smart Enough to Know How Smart Animals Are?, 2016. 
 The Bonobo and the Atheist, 2013. 
 The Age of Empathy: Nature's Lessons for a Kinder Society, 2009. 
 Primates and Philosophers: How Morality Evolved, 2006.  
 Our Inner Ape. New York: Riverhead Books, 2005.  
 Animal Social Complexity: Intelligence, Culture, and Individualized Societies, Edited with Peter L. Tyack.  Cambridge: Harvard University Press, 2003.  .
 My Family Album, Thirty Years of Primate Photography 2003.
 Tree of Origin: What Primate Behavior Can Tell Us about Human Social Evolution, Harvard University Press, 2001. .
 The Ape and the Sushi Master, Cultural reflections by a primatologist.  New York: Basic Books, 2001.  
 Chimpanzee Politics: Power and Sex Among Apes (25th Anniversary ed.). Baltimore, MD: JHU Press; 2007. .
 Natural Conflict Resolution. 2000 (with Filippo Aureli)
 Bonobo: The Forgotten Ape.  Berkeley: University of California Press, 1997.  (with Frans Lanting)
 Good Natured: The Origins of Right and Wrong in Humans and Other Animals.  Cambridge: Harvard University Press, 1996.  
 Chimpanzee Cultures, Edited with Richard Wrangham, W.C. McGrew, and Paul Heltne. Foreword by Jane Goodall. Cambridge: Harvard University Press, 1994. .
 Peacemaking Among Primates.  Cambridge: Harvard University Press, 1989.

Articles
 2015 Opinion piece about the discovery of Homo naledi in The New York Times
 2013 Opinion piece about animal intelligence in The Wall Street Journal
 2010 Opinion piece about God and morality in The New York Times
 2010 
 2009, 
 2008 
 2007, "Bonobos, Left & Right" Skeptic, (August 8, 2007).
 2006, 
 2005, "The empathic ape", New Scientist, October 8, 2005 
 2001, "Do Humans Alone 'Feel Your Pain'?" (Chronicle.com, October 26, 2001)
 1999, 
 1995,

Additional reading

See also
The Genius of Charles Darwin (Richard Dawkins interviews De Waal)
The Family of Chimps, a Dutch documentary film based on de Waal's book, Chimpanzee Politics and Our Inner Ape

References

External links

 The surprising science of alpha males TED talk by Frans de Waal.
 Do animals have morals?  TED talk by Frans de Waal.
 Interview with Frans de Waal on the BBC Radio 4 programme The Life Scientific.
 .
 Frans de Waal An extended film interview with transcripts for the 'Why Are We Here?' documentary series.

1948 births
Living people
List of atheists (surnames C to D)
Animal cognition writers
Dutch animal welfare scholars
Dutch biologists
Dutch expatriates in the United States
Emory University faculty
Ethologists
Fellows of the American Academy of Arts and Sciences
Human evolution theorists
Knights of the Order of the Netherlands Lion
Members of the American Philosophical Society
Members of the Royal Netherlands Academy of Arts and Sciences
Members of the United States National Academy of Sciences
People from 's-Hertogenbosch
Primatologists
Utrecht University alumni